The Paris Declaration respecting Maritime Law of 16 April 1856 was an international multilateral treaty agreed to by the warring parties in the Crimean War gathered at the Congress at Paris after the peace treaty of Paris had been signed in March 1856. As an important juridical novelty in international law the treaty for the first time created the possibility for nations that were not involved in the establishment of the agreement and did not sign, to become a party by acceding the declaration afterwards. So did altogether 55 nations, which otherwise would have been possible in such a short period. This represented a large step in the globalisation of international law.

The primary goal of France and Great Britain was to abolish privateering, a part of naval warfare whereby a belligerent party gave formal permission to privately owned ships by letters of marque to seize enemy vessels. By disrupting commerce, privateers could be effective against enemies that depended on trade and force them to deploy their warships to protect their merchant ships. In this way, maritime nations could wage war against larger land-based powers by the destruction of the their commerce.  The Paris Declaration established international policies related to neutral and belligerent shipping on the high seas, introducing new rules for prizes of war, a piece of enemy property seized by a belligerent party during or after a war or battle, typically at sea. The plenipotentiaries agreed on three major points: free ships make free goods, effective blockade, and no privateering. In return for surrendering the practice of seizing neutral goods on enemy ships, France insisted on Britain's abandoning its Rule of 1756 prohibiting neutral assumption of enemy coastal and colonial trade.

History 
To put an end to the Crimean War (1853–1856), a series of diplomatic meetings were organised in Paris to negotiate peace, modelled after the Congress of Vienna. On the conclusion of the Treaty of Paris, which was signed on 30 March 1856, the plenipotentiaries assembled in conference also did agree on this declaration, at the suggestion of Count Walewski, the French Prime-Minister. The declaration is the outcome of a modus vivendi signed between France and Britain at the dawn of the Crimean War in 1854 becoming war allies for the first time. These two powers had agreed that they would not seize enemy goods on neutral vessels nor neutral goods on enemy vessels. The belligerents had also agreed that they would not issue letters of marque, which they actually had not done during the war. At the close of this war the principal states of Europe concluded that private armed ships, maintained at private cost for private gain, and often necessarily for a long time beyond the reach of the regular naval force of the state, could not be kept under proper control. With the agreements written down in the Declaration of Paris these rules were confirmed and added to them the principle that blockades, in order to be obligatory, must be effective.

The Declaration did not as such make privateers into a new category of international criminals, but rather made it a treaty obligation of states that they refrain from commissioning privateers in the first place. Most states normally treated foreign privateers as pirates in any case. In the plain wordings of the Declaration:
 Privateering is and remains abolished;
 The neutral flag covers enemy's goods, with the exception of contraband of war;
 Neutral goods, with the exception of contraband of war, are not liable to capture under enemy's flag;
 Blockades, in order to be binding, must be effective-that is to say, maintained by a forge sufficient really to prevent access to the coast of the enemy.
The Declaration has been signed by Great Britain, Austria, France, Prussia, Russia, Sardinia and Turkey
Ultimately, 55 states, royal houses and free cities ratified the Declaration, including the Ottoman Empire. This treaty established maritime law among the major powers of Europe. It represented the first multilateral attempt to codify in times of peace rules which were to be applicable in the event of war. This declaration bound only its signatories and nations that did accede later, when at war with each other, and left them free to use privateers when at war with other states.

Position of the United States 
The United States, which aimed at a complete exemption of non-contraband private property from capture at sea, withheld its formal adherence in 1857 when its “Marcy” amendment was not accepted by all powers, chiefly as a result of British influence.  His proposed amendment would have exempted from seizure in time of war all private property that was not contraband, including enslaved persons.  The US was also keen on maintaining privateers. It argued that, not possessing a great navy, it would be obliged in time of war to rely largely upon merchant ships commissioned as war vessels, and that therefore the abolition of privateering would be entirely in favour of European powers, whose large navies rendered them practically independent of such aid. Several other maritime states did not accede to the declaration, such as China, Venezuela, Bolivia, Costa Rica, Honduras, and El Salvador.

In 1861, during the American Civil War, the United States declared that it would respect the principles of the declaration during hostilities.  The Confederacy agreed to the provisions except for the right of privateering, and went on to extensively employ privateers as blockade runners. During the Spanish–American War of 1898, when the United States Government affirmed its policy of conducting hostilities in conformity with the dispositions of the declaration. Spain too, though not a party, declared its intention to abide by the declaration, but it expressly gave notice that it reserved its right to issue letters of marque. At the same time both belligerents organized services of auxiliary cruisers composed of merchant ships under the command of naval officers.

Some of the questions raised by this declaration were clarified by the 1907 Hague Convention.

The rules contained in this declaration later came to be considered as part of the general principles of international law and the United States too, though not formally a party, abides by provisions.

Signing parties 
The following states signed the Paris Declaration or did accede afterwards:
Argentina
Belgium
Brazil
Bulgaria
Chile
Denmark
Ecuador
France
Greece
Guatemala
Haiti
Japan
Mexico
Netherlands
Ottoman Empire
Peru
Portugal
Republic of New Granada (modern-day Colombia and Panama)
Russia
Spain
States now part of Italy:
Duchy of Modena and Reggio
Duchy of Parma
Grand Duchy of Tuscany
Kingdom of Sardinia
Kingdom of the Two Sicilies
Papal States
States within the German Confederation:
Austrian Empire
Duchy of Brunswick
Duchy of Mecklenburg-Schwerin
Duchy of Mecklenburg-Strelitz
Duchy of Nassau
Duchy of Saxe-Altenburg
Duchy of Saxe-Coburg and Gotha
Duchy of Saxe-Meiningen
Duchy of Saxe-Weimar
Electorate of Hesse
Free City of Bremen
Free City of Frankfurt
Free City of Hamburg
Free City of Lübeck
Grand Duchy of Baden
Grand Duchy of Oldenburg
Kingdom of Bavaria
Kingdom of Prussia
Kingdom of Saxony
Kingdom of Württemberg
Landgraviate of Hesse-Darmstadt
Principality of Anhalt-Dessau
Sweden-Norway
Switzerland
United Kingdom
Uruguay

See also 
 Hague Conventions (1907) which expanded on the provisions of this declaration.

Notes

References 

 Spencer, Warren F. "The Mason Memorandum and the Diplomatic Origins of the Declaration of Paris." in by N.N. Barker and M.L. Brown, eds. Diplomacy in an Age of Nationalism (1971) pp. 44–66.

Further reading 

Sir Thomas Barclay, Problems of International Practice and Diplomacy (London, 1907), chap. xv. 2  online
T. Gibson Bowles, The Declaration of Paris of 1856: being an account of the maritime rights of Great Britain; a consideration of their importance; a history of their surrender by the signature of the Declaration of Paris (London, 1900) online

International law
Privateering
Law of the sea treaties
1856 treaties
Treaties of Argentina
Treaties of the Duchy of Anhalt
Treaties of the Austrian Empire
Treaties of the Grand Duchy of Baden
Treaties of the Kingdom of Bavaria
Treaties of Belgium
Treaties of the Empire of Brazil
Treaties of Bremen (state)
Treaties of the Duchy of Brunswick
Treaties of the Principality of Bulgaria
Treaties of Chile
Treaties of Denmark
Treaties of Ecuador
Treaties of the Second French Empire
Treaties of the Free City of Frankfurt
Treaties of the German Confederation
Treaties of the Kingdom of Greece
Treaties of Guatemala
Treaties of Haiti
Treaties of Hamburg
Treaties of the Kingdom of Hanover
Treaties of the Electorate of Hesse
Treaties of the Grand Duchy of Hesse
Treaties of the Empire of Japan
Treaties of the Free City of Lübeck
Treaties of the Grand Duchy of Mecklenburg-Schwerin
Treaties of the Grand Duchy of Mecklenburg-Strelitz
Treaties of the Holy See (754–1870)
Treaties of Mexico
Treaties of the Duchy of Modena and Reggio
Treaties of the Duchy of Nassau
Treaties of the Netherlands
Treaties of the Republic of New Granada
Treaties of Norway
Treaties of the Duchy of Oldenburg
Treaties of the Ottoman Empire
Treaties of the Duchy of Parma
Treaties of Peru
Treaties of the Kingdom of Portugal
Treaties of the Kingdom of Prussia
Treaties of the Russian Empire
Treaties of the Kingdom of Sardinia
Treaties of the Duchy of Saxe-Altenburg
Treaties of Saxe-Coburg and Gotha
Treaties of the Duchy of Saxe-Meiningen
Treaties of the Grand Duchy of Saxe-Weimar-Eisenach
Treaties of the Kingdom of Saxony
Treaties of the First Spanish Republic
Treaties of the Spanish Empire
Treaties of Sweden
Treaties of Switzerland
Treaties of the Kingdom of the Two Sicilies
Treaties of the Grand Duchy of Tuscany
Treaties of the United Kingdom (1801–1922)
Treaties of Uruguay
Treaties of the Kingdom of Württemberg
International humanitarian law treaties
1856 in France
1856 in the Kingdom of the Two Sicilies